Himalayan Blues Festival is an annual international music festival showcasing live performances followed by cultural events. Since its inception in 2007, The Himalayan Blues Festival has featured a diverse range of blues artist from around the globe and has helped introduce blues music in Nepal and the region. In its recent incarnation the festival has expanded to other cities in South Asia. The festival was founded in Nepal by Samik Kharel, which later expanded to many Indian cities bringing hundreds of local and international musicians.

Past event
The first edition of the Himalayan Blues Festival was held between 5–9 September. The theme of the first edition of the festival was called the voice of unity. The 2009 version was held in various places in Kathmandu. The festival in 2009 featured artist from United States, Australia, United Kingdom, India, New Zealand and Nepal. The event was documented by filmmaker Costa Botes.

See also

List of blues festivals
List of folk festivals

References

Music festivals established in 2007
Blues festivals in Nepal
Folk festivals in Nepal
2007 establishments in Nepal